Kerstin Ulrika Flodin (née Johansson; born 9 February 1975) is a retired Swedish middle- and long-distance runner. She represented her country at the 2009 World Championships and 2010 World Indoor Championships.

International competitions

Personal bests
Outdoor
800 metres – 2:07.48 (Stockholm 2008)
1500 metres – 4:15.77 (Heusden-Zolder 2006)
One mile – 4:49.51 (Enskede 2005)
3000 metres – 9:22.03 (Oslo 2010)
5000 metres – 16:17.49 (Malmö 2009)
3000 metres steeplechase – 9:38.88 (Berlin 2009)
10 kilometres – 36:43 (Stockholm 2015)
Indoor
800 metres – 2:09.77 (Sätra 2001)
1500 metres – 4:11.52 (Stockholm 2010)
3000 metres – 9:05.2 (Birmingham 2010)

References

1975 births
Living people
Swedish female middle-distance runners
Swedish female steeplechase runners
World Athletics Championships athletes for Sweden
People from Östhammar Municipality
Sportspeople from Uppsala County
21st-century Swedish women